Alan Weiss (born March 7, 1948 in Chicago, Illinois) is an American comics artist and writer known for his work for DC Comics and Marvel Comics.

Career
Alan Weiss began his professional comics career at Warren Publishing by drawing the story "Gunsmoke Charly!" in Creepy #35 (Sept. 1970). The following year, he began working for Marvel Comics as well where he drew The Avengers, Captain America, Daredevil, Sub-Mariner, and The Amazing Spider-Man.

Weiss recalled in a 2006 interview there was a "lost" Adam Warlock story, which if completed would have been reminiscent of the Jonathan Swift novel Gulliver's Travels. Portions of it were printed in the second volume of Marvel Masterworks: Warlock.  The remainder of the artwork was lost in a New York City taxicab in 1976.

In 1977, Weiss was one of the artists on the first issue of Marvel Comics Super Special which featured the rock band Kiss in a 40-page fictional adventure written by Steve Gerber. Kiss reappeared in an occult adventure in issue #5 (1978) which was co-written by Weiss. In April 1978, Weiss and writer E. Nelson Bridwell revamped the Captain Marvel character for DC with Weiss providing more realistic art for the series. Dennis O'Neil and Weiss created the character Calypso in The Amazing Spider-Man #209 (Oct. 1980).

Weiss created the Steelgrip Starkey and the All-Purpose Power Tool limited series for Marvel Comics' Epic Comics comics line in 1986 and War Dancer for Defiant Comics in 1994. Weiss has worked on DC Comics' alternate universe series Elseworlds, co-writing and pencilling the Batman graphic novel The Blue, the Grey and the Bat as well as Paradox Press' The Big Book Of series, doing many pages on a variety of historical topics. From 2002 to 2005, he contributed work to Tom Strong's Terrific Tales published by America's Best Comics.

His work has appeared in the comic books The Human Drama, Big Apple Comix, The Twilight Zone, Boris Karloff Tales of Mystery, and Our Love Story; in Warren Publishing's black-and-white horror comics magazines Creepy and Eerie; and the satirical magazines National Lampoon and Blast.

Inker Joe Rubinstein called Weiss "the most difficult guy in the business to ink, without exception." He added that this also made him one of his favorite artists to ink, because Weiss's work was so intricate that he couldn't tell what the final art would look like until he had finished inking it.

Bibliography

Archie Comics
 Lancelot Strong, the Shield #1 (1983)

Atlas/Seaboard Comics
 Brute #3 (1975)

Big Apple Productions
 Big Apple Comix #1 (1975): "The Battery's Down" pencils and inks

DC Comics

 All-Star Western (El Diablo) (1971) #5 "The Devil Rides for Vengeance!" pencils;  #7 "The Gypsy Curse" pencils  
 Armageddon: Alien Agenda #3 (1992) "The West Years of Our Lives" pencils
 Batman: The Blue, the Grey, and the Bat graphic novel (1993) co-writer, pencils
 Heroes Against Hunger #1 (Superman and Batman) (1986) 
 House of Mystery #205 (1972) "Over the High Side" pencils
 House of Secrets (1971) #92 "It's Better to Give" pencils; #94 "A Bottle of Incense...A Whiff of the Past!" pencils and co-inks
 Korak, Son of Tarzan #46 (1972) 
 Mystery in Space #112 (1980) "Howl" pencils
 Richard Dragon, Kung-Fu Fighter #2 (1975) "If You've Got to Die...Die Fighting!" "A Dragon Fights Alone" pencils
 Secret Origins vol. 2 #34 (Captain Atom); #50 (1988–1990) 
 Shazam #34 (1978) 
 The Superman Family #186 (Supergirl) (1977) "Rendezvous with Reality" penciller
 Super-Team Family #11 (The Flash and Supergirl) (1977) 
 Weird Worlds #1–3 (1972)
 Who's Who: The Definitive Directory of the DC Universe #4 (1985)
 Young Love #94, 124 (1972–1977)

America's Best Comics
 Tom Strong #8 (2000) cover and "Riders of the Lost Mesa" pencils and inks
 Tom Strong's Terrific Tales #1–12 (2002–2005) "Young Tom Strong" series: pencils and inks #1–7, 12; pencils #8–12, covers #3, #11

Paradox Press
 The Big Book of Urban Legends (1994) "The Bullet Through the Balls" pencils and inks
 The Big Book of Freaks (1996) "Omi the Great" pencils and inks
 The Big Book of Little Criminals (1996) "The Royal Moll" pencils and inks
 The Big Book of Losers (1997) "The Dalton Gang's Last Raid" pencils and inks
 The Big Book of Scandal (1997) "Death of a Mystery Man" pencils and inks
 The Big Book of the Weird Wild West (1998) "Ned Buntline: King of the Dime Novelists" pencils and inks

Defiant
 Defiant Genesis #1 (1993) cover pencil and ink
 War Dancer #1–6 (1994–1995) creator, writer #1–6; pencils #1–3, #5–6, covers #1–6

Gold Key Comics
 Boris Karloff Tales of Mystery #36 (1971) "Troll Bridge" pencil and ink
 The Twilight Zone #39 (1971)

Marvel Comics

 Amazing High Adventure #2 (1985) "Palm Sunday" pencils and inks
 The Amazing Spider-Man #209 (1980) cover and "To Salvage My Honor" pencils
 The Avengers #215 (1982) cover and "All the Ways of Power!" pencils; #216 (1982) cover and "...To Avenge the Avengers!" pencils 
 Captain America #164 (1973) "Queen of the Werewolves" pencils and inks
 The Cat #4 (1973) 
 Daredevil #83 (1972) "The Widow Accused" pencils
 Deadly Hands of Kung Fu #2 (1974) 
 Dracula Lives #1 (1973) "Suffer Not A Witch" pencils; #3 (1973) "Castle of the Undead" pencils 
 Heroes for Hope Starring the X-Men #1 (1985) 
 Iron Man #136 (1980) 
 John Carter, Warlord of Mars Annual #3 (1979) 
 Kull and the Barbarians #2–3 (Solomon Kane) (1975) 
 Marvel Comics Super Special #1 (penciller), #5 (writer) (Kiss) (1977–1978)
 Marvel Fanfare #14 (Inhumans); #49 (Doctor Strange) (1984–1990)
 Official Handbook of the Marvel Universe #3, 8–10 (1983)
 Official Handbook of the Marvel Universe Deluxe Edition #3, 9 (1986)
 Our Love Story #15–17 (1972) 
 Power Man and Iron Fist #69 (1981) 
 The Spectacular Spider-Man Annual #3 (1981) 
 Sub-Mariner #54 (1972) 
 What If...? #37 (Beast) (1983)

Epic Comics
 Steelgrip Starkey #1–6 (1986–1987) creator, writer; pencils #1–2, #6, covers #1–6
 Video Jack #5 (1988) "Wipeout Wipeout Wipeout" pencils

Image Comics
 Daring Escapes featuring Houdini #1–4 (1998–1999) pencils, covers #1–4
 Next Issue Project: Silver Streak Comics #24" (2009) "Captain Battle" pencils and inks
 Next Issue Project: Crack Comics #63" (2011) "Captain Triumph" writer and pencils, alternate cover
 Spawn #75 (1998) "Daring Escapes Preview" pencils

National Lampoon
 National Lampoon November 1982 "Robbers of the Lost Crock" pencils and inks

Warrant Publishing
 The Creeps #4 (2015) "Off to Feed the Wizard" writer, pencils and inks

Warren Publishing
 Creepy #35 (1970) "Gunsmoke Charly" writer, pencils and inks
 Eerie #34 (1971) "Lair of the Horned Men" writer, pencils and inks

References

External links
 
 Surreal Deal Studios Alan Weiss art commissions web site.
 Alan Weiss at Mike's Amazing World of Comics
 Alan Weiss at the Unofficial Handbook of Marvel Comics Creators

1948 births
20th-century American artists
21st-century American artists
American comics artists
American comics writers
Artists from Chicago
Comics inkers
DC Comics people
Living people
Marvel Comics people
Marvel Comics writers